= Javed Iqbal Tarkai =

Pakistani politician

Member of the Khyber Pakhtunkhwa Assembly
- In office 2008–2013

Personal details
- Born: Swabi, Khyber Pakhtunkhwa, Pakistan
- Occupation: Politician

Javed Iqbal Tarkai is a Pakistani politician from Swabi who served as a member of the Khyber Pakhtunkhwa Assembly from 2008 to 2013.
